Thambiran Vanakkam (also known as Doctrina Christam en Lingua Malauar Tamul in Portuguese) is a Catholic catechism translated by Henrique Henriques and published on 20 October 1578 at Quilon, Venad. It is the first printed work in an Indian language and script.

See also 
Printing in Tamil language

References 

Printing in India
Tamil-language literature
History of Kollam

External links
 Thambiran Vanakkam